This article lists the prime ministers of Republika Srpska, the head of the Government of Republika Srpska.

The prime minister is nominated by the President of Republika Srpska, and appointed by the National Assembly of Republika Srpska. Radovan Višković is the 12th and current prime minister of Republika Srpska. He took office on 18 December 2018, following the 2018 general election.

Prime ministers of Republika Srpska (1992–present)

Timeline

See also
President of Republika Srpska
List of presidents of Republika Srpska
List of vice presidents of Republika Srpska
List of speakers of the National Assembly of Republika Srpska

Standard

References

External links
World Statesmen – Republika Srpska

Prime ministers
Republika Srpska
Prime ministers of Republika Srpska